Jow Khvah (also Romanized as Jow Khvāh; also known as Chahār Deh and Jowkhāh) is a village in Montazeriyeh Rural District, in the Central District of Tabas County, South Khorasan Province, Iran. At the 2006 census, its population was 908, in 237 families.

References 

Populated places in Tabas County